Get Shorty is a 1990 novel by American novelist Elmore Leonard. In 1995, the novel was adapted into a film of the same name, and in 2017 it was adapted into a television series of the same name.

Plot summary
The story centers on Ernesto "Chili" Palmer, a small-time loan shark based in Miami. After a run-in with mobster Ray "Bones" Barboni, Chili goes to Las Vegas in pursuit of Leo Devoe, a dry cleaner who has scammed an airline out of $300,000 in life insurance by faking his death, as well as avoiding his $10,000 debt to Chili's employers.

After relieving Leo of the money in Vegas, Chili gambles it all away. At the casino, he finds a more interesting assignment: the casino is looking to collect from Harry Zimm, a horror film producer based in Los Angeles. Chili, very interested in the movie business, heads for Los Angeles to make Zimm pay.

Chili sneaks into the house of actress Karen Flores, where Harry is staying, in the middle of the night. After he warns Harry to pay his Las Vegas markers, he explains that he has an idea for a movie. Harry is immediately taken in by Chili's charm and his movie premise. For the movie's plot, Chili recounts Leo's story to Harry in the third person, as if it were a work of fiction. Karen recognizes the premise as a true story and identifies Chili as the unnamed shylock.

The next morning, Harry asks for Chili's help in dealing with a movie script for Mr. Lovejoy he wants to buy from his writer's widow, Doris Saffron, who wants $500,000 for it and he guaranteed a $200,000 investment from Bo Catlett, a local limo driver and drug dealer, to make another movie, Freaks. (Harry gambled Bo's $200,000 away in the Vegas in hope of making the $500,000 he needed for Mr. Lovejoy). In a meeting with Bo, Harry and Chili tell them that their investment in Freaks is sound but they are making another movie first. Bo tells them to move the money into the new picture; Harry says he cannot since the new movie deal is "structured."

Bo is involved in a Mexican drug deal that falls through. He has left the payment in a locker at the Los Angeles airport but the Colombian sent to receive the money, Yayo, does not feel safe unlocking the locker with so many DEA agents staked out nearby. Bo later meets Yayo at the limo garage and after Yayo threatens to tell the DEA who Bo is, Bo shoots him.

Bo soon offers the locker money to Harry as an investment and tells him to send Chili to get the money. Chili senses something wrong, signs out a nearby locker as a test and is taken for questioning by DEA agents. After the questioning, Chili seeks the interests of Michael Weir, a top-tier Hollywood actor to play the lead in "Mr. Lovejoy".

Ray Barboni, after learning about Leo's money from his wife, comes to Los Angeles looking for the money Chili collected from Leo, only to find the key to the locker from the failed drug deal in one of Chili's pockets. Thinking Chili has stashed his cash in a locker, he goes to the airport and is busted by drug officials.

In a final showdown with Bo, Chili is held at gunpoint by Catlett. One of Catlett's henchman, known as the Bear, arrives just in time to apprehend Catlett, and in the struggle for the gun, Catlett falls through the railing of his sun deck. As Chili recounts his story to Karen and Harry, it shares some comparisons with Mr. Lovejoy.

Adaptations
In 1995, a film adaptation was released. In 2016, Epix announced that a Get Shorty TV series was ordered. Ray Romano and Chris O'Dowd star in the series. The first season premiered on August 13, 2017.

Notes

1990 American novels
American crime novels
Novels by Elmore Leonard
Hollywood novels
American novels adapted into films
Novels about film directors and producers
American novels adapted into television shows
de:Schnappt Shorty